Ida Maria Åkerblom (September 14, 1898 – February 25, 1981) was the leader of the Finnish Åkerblom Movement, an evangelical movement sometimes called a "cult". She had also served some time in prison. Her movement deemed her a prophet and began in the 1920s. Maria Åkerblom is characterized by Aarni Voipio as a "sleeping preacher", that is, a person who preaches in a state of trance.

The 2019 Zaida Bergroth film Maria's Paradise is based on Åkerblom's life.

References

1898 births
1981 deaths
People from Raseborg
People from Uusimaa Province (Grand Duchy of Finland)
Swedish-speaking Finns
Finnish Christians